"My Kind of Girl" is a song written by Debi Cochran, John Jarrard and Monty Powell, and recorded by American country music singer Collin Raye that reached the top of the Billboard Hot Country Singles & Tracks chart.  It was released in November 1994 as the fourth single from his album Extremes.

Chart performance
The song debuted at number 61 on the Hot Country Singles & Tracks chart dated December 3, 1994. It charted for 20 weeks on that chart, and became Collin's third Number One single on the chart dated February 18, 1995, holding the top spot for one week.

Charts

Year-end charts

References

1994 singles
1994 songs
Collin Raye songs
Song recordings produced by Paul Worley
Songs written by John Jarrard
Songs written by Monty Powell
Epic Records singles